Helgoland, WAB 71, is a secular, patriotic  cantata for male choir and orchestra, composed by Anton Bruckner in 1893. Since Bruckner did not complete the 9th symphony, Helgoland is his last complete work.

History
One year earlier, Bruckner had already composed another, shorter patriotic work, Der deutsche Gesang (WAB 63), that was premiered at the First German Academic Song Festival in Salzburg in June 1892.

Helgoland was composed in April 1893 for the Men's Choir of Vienna to celebrate its 50th birthday. The text was written by August Silberstein, who had already provided poems set to music by Bruckner (Germanenzug in 1864 and Vaterlandslied in 1866).

The setting was a case of interest, as the Frisian island of Heligoland had just been given to Germany in 1890 by Great Britain (in exchange for Zanzibar). Helgoland was conducted on 8 October 1893 by the Men's Choir of Vienna and the Vienna Philharmonic Orchestra under Eduard Kremser's baton in the Winterreitschule of the Hofburg Palace.

Bruckner legated the manuscript to the Österreichische Nationalbibliothek. The work was first published as vocal and piano reduction score by Cyrill Hynais in 1893. The vocal and orchestral score was posthumously issued by Doblinger, Vienna in 1899.

Text 

The text from August Silberstein's Mein Herz in Liedern focuses on the Saxon people of the island who are threatened by the invasion of the Romans, but divine intervention saves them:

Setting 
The 317-bar long composition in G minor, scored for  male choir and orchestra (2 flutes, 2 oboes, 2 clarinets, 2 bassoons, 4 horns, 3 trumpets, 3 trombones, contrabass tuba, timpani, cymbal and strings), is set as a three-part sonata form with coda.

The piece is full of strength and enthusiasm, and carries the mark of Wagner's influence. The orchestral introduction depicts already the atmosphere of storm and fate, which hangs over the text. The first part (first three strophes) depicts the approach of the enemies and the announcement of the prayer, the mid-part (next two strophes) depicts the invocation of the deity, and the third part (reprise with development) depicts the storm and the sinking of the enemies. The coda on the last verse "O Herrgott, dich preiset frei Helgoland!, with a cymbal crash near the end (bar 309), is a hymn to the deity.

Duration: about 13 minutes.

Discography
Helgoland is seldom played presumably because of the text, a poem with German patriotic content, but also the high requirements, i.e., a symphonic orchestra and a professional men's choir.Fritz Oeser made an adaptation of the work for mixed choir and orchestra, and put on it a new text „Dröhne, du Donner“ (Roar, you Thunder!), so that the work would be performed more often. However, no recording of this adaptation is available as yet.

Many noted Brucknerian conductors have neglected to record the work, although Daniel Barenboim has done it twice, at the time of his playing the symphonies of Bruckner with the Chicago Symphony Orchestra and with the Berlin Philharmonic Orchestra.

There are four commercial recordings of the work:
 Wyn Morris, Symphonica of London and Ambrosian Chorus – LP: Symphonica SYM 11 (with Wagner's "Das Liebesmahl der Apostel"), 1977; transferred to CD: IMP PCD 1042, 1993; CD: Klassic Haus KHCD-2012-043, 2012 (with Symphony No. 6 by Heinz Bongartz)
 Daniel Barenboim, Chicago Symphony Orchestra and Chicago Symphony Chorus – LP: DG 2707 116, 1979 (with Symphony "No. 0" and Psalm 150); transferred to DGG CDs: 6 October 1992 and 1 May 1995. 
 Daniel Barenboim, Berlin Philharmonic Orchestra, Berlin Radio Choir and Ernst Senff Choir – CD: Teldec 0630 16646-2, 1992 (with Symphony No. 1); reissued on CD: Elektra/Wea/Teldec, June 16, 1998; in a CD-box of Barenboim's Berlin cycle by Warner Classics, 10 January 2006.
 Alberto Hold-Garrido, Choruses for Male Voices and Orchestra, Lund University Student Singers and Malmö Opera Orchestra – CD: Naxos 8572871, 2012

Note A not-issued recording by Takashi Asahina can be heard on John Berky's website: Helgoland by T. Asahina with the Osaka Philharmonic Orchestra (1987) [Download of the Month for September, 2013]. The December, 2022 Download of the Month on the site was the 1993 out-of-print recording of the work by Wyn Morris. Other not-issued recodings by among others, Gennadi Rozhdestvensky and Neeme Järvi are stored in the Bruckner Archive.
 Helgoland  has also been performed at the Brucknerfest 2022 (Brucknerfest 2022 - Krieg und Frieden (29-09-2022)). A recording is available in the Bruckner Archive.

References

Sources 
 Anton Bruckner – Sämtliche Werke, Band XXII/2: Kantaten und Chorwerke II (1862–1893), Musikwissenschaftlicher Verlag der Internationalen Bruckner-Gesellschaft, Franz Burkhart, Rudolf H. Führer and Leopold Nowak (Editor), Vienna, 1987 (Available on IMSLP: Neue Gesamtausgabe, XXII/2. Kantaten und Chorwerke Teil 2: Nr. 6-8)
 Uwe Harten, Anton Bruckner. Ein Handbuch. , Salzburg, 1996. .
 Cornelis van Zwol, Anton Bruckner - Leven en Werken, Thot, Bussum (Netherlands), 2012.

External links
 
Helgoland g-Moll, WAB 71 Critical discography by Hans Roelofs  

Cantatas by Anton Bruckner
Compositions in G minor
1893 compositions
German patriotic songs